R v Soqokomashe is an important case in South African law, heard in the Eastern Districts Local Division by Price JP and Jennett J on 2 March 1956, with judgment handed down on 9 March.

Facts 
The appellants had pleaded guilty to a charge of arson, it being alleged that they had set fire to a rondavel classroom of a "native" school. The Crown evidence showed that the structure was immovable, but that there was no evidence to prove that it had been burned intentionally.

Judgment 
In an appeal from convictions in a magistrate's court, the court held that, as long as an accidental burning had not been excluded by the evidence as a reasonable possibility, it could not be said that it had been proved aliunde beyond a reasonable doubt that the crime had been committed. The court held further that the case should not be remitted for further evidence.

See also 
 R v Mataung
 Arson
 Crime in South Africa
 Law of South Africa

References

Case law 
 R v Soqokomashe 1956 (2) SA 142 (E).

Notes 

1956 in South African law
1956 in case law
Arson in Africa